Nephrotoma cornicina is a species of fly in the family Tipulidae.

Subspecies
Subspecies include:
Nephrotoma cornicina cornicina (Linnaeus, 1758) 
Nephrotoma cornicina sardiniensis Oosterbroek, 1978  (Sardinia)

Distribution
This species is widely distributed in the  Palearctic realm. It can be found in most of Europe (Albania, Andorra, Austria, Belarus, Belgium, Bosnia-Herzegovina, Bulgaria, Croatia, Czech Republic, Denmark, Estonia, Finland, France, Germany, Great Britain, Greece, Hungary, Ireland, Italy, Latvia, Lithuania, Luxembourg, Malta, Montenegro, Netherlands, North Macedonia, Norway, Poland, Portugal, Romania, Serbia, Slovakia, Slovenia, Spain, Sweden, Switzerland, Ukraine), in the European Russia, in  Kazakhstan, Turkmenistan, Uzbekistan, Tajikistan, Kyrgyzstan, Afghanistan, Mongolia, Japan, China, India, Pakistan, in the Nearctic realm (Canada, United States), and in the Near East (Georgia, Armenia, Azerbaijan, Turkey, Cyprus, Lebanon, Israel, Iran).

Habitat
These flies mainly inhabit turf grass and hedge rows.

Description
On the wings the stigma is quite small, brown or black, clearly distinct. These flies have slender-bodies, with elongate an rather narrow wings and very long and slender legs. Ocelli are absent and the occipital mark is black. Flagellum is entirely black. Abdomen is mainly yellow, with a dark median stripe, sometimes absent on tergites 6 and 7. In males sternite 8 shows a straight rather long appendage directed at caudal margin. Tergite 9 is short and rather broad, swollen and rounded towards sides. The females have a pointed shiny brown ovipositor with a black basal half, for laying eggs into the ground.

Biology
Adults can be found from late April to mid-September. They feed on nectar of Taraxacum campylodes  and Anthriscus sylvestris.

References

External links
Images representing Nephrotoma at BOLD
 Crane Flies

Tipulidae
Flies described in 1758
Nematoceran flies of Europe
Taxa named by Carl Linnaeus